Hazlet is a station on New Jersey Transit's North Jersey Coast Line in Hazlet, Monmouth County, New Jersey. The station is located between a stretch of tracks from Keyport–Holmdel Road (Monmouth County Route 4) to Hazlet Avenue.

History 
Opened as Holmdel, Hazlet station opened in 1875 as part of the New York and Long Branch Railroad, a subsidiary of both the Pennsylvania Railroad and the Central Railroad of New Jersey. The station name changed to Hazlet in 1879 when it was determined to be confusing for the Holmdel in Monmouth County. The station was renamed after John Hazlett, a local settler and property owner. The agency at Hazlet closed in 1952. 

The station was rebuilt in 2003, completed on May 27 at a cost of $6.1 million. The refurbishment included two new side high-platforms and new canopies to conform with ADA regulations. The abandoned, historic Vecchi Ketchup Factory chimney at the site of the new station project was dismantled to make way for additional parking spaces.

Station layout
The station has two tracks and two high-level side platforms. The station is compliant with the Americans with Disabilities Act of 1990. The station has three parking lots, with a total of 600 daily and permit parking spaces.

References

External links

Parking and Boarding Improvements Completed at Hazlet Train Station

Railway stations in Monmouth County, New Jersey
NJ Transit Rail Operations stations
Stations on the North Jersey Coast Line
Hazlet, New Jersey
Railway stations in the United States opened in 1875
Former New York and Long Branch Railroad stations